Vehicle registration plates of Bahrain have the Flag of Bahrain and the country's name in Arabic and Latin script. Special vehicles such as diplomatic cars have a colored bar in the upper section of the license plate without the flag. License plates for private vehicle owners are blue with a white background. In 2010, Bahrain switched to the version which is in use today.

The international vehicle registration code for Bahrain is BRN.

Types of license plates

References

External links 

Transport in Bahrain
Bahrain
Bahrain transport-related lists